"Like Father Like Son" is a song written by Paul Overstreet and Don Schlitz, and recorded by American country music artist Lionel Cartwright.  It was released in February 1989 as the second single from the album Lionel Cartwright.  The song reached number 14 on the Billboard Hot Country Singles & Tracks chart, and was Cartwright's first Top 40 hit.

Chart performance

References

1989 singles
Lionel Cartwright songs
Songs written by Paul Overstreet
Songs written by Don Schlitz
Song recordings produced by Tony Brown (record producer)
MCA Records singles
1989 songs